Giovanni Brusca (born 20 February 1957) is an Italian mobster and former member of the Corleonesi clan of the Sicilian Mafia. He had a major role in the 1992 murders of Antimafia Commission prosecutor Giovanni Falcone and businessman Ignazio Salvo, and once stated that he had committed between 100 and 200 murders. Brusca had been sentenced to life imprisonment in absentia for Mafia association and multiple murder. He was captured in 1996, turned pentito, and his sentence reduced to 26 years in prison. In 2021, Brusca was released from prison.

A pudgy, bearded, and unkempt mafioso, Brusca was known in Mafia circles as u verru (in Sicilian), il porco or il maiale (in Italian; "the pig", "the swine"), and u scannacristiani ("the people-slayer"; in the Sicilian language, the word cristianu means both "Christian" and "human being"). Tommaso Buscetta, the Mafia turncoat who had cooperated with Falcone's investigations, remembered Giovanni Brusca as "a wild stallion but a great leader".

Early life

Brusca was born on 20 February 1957 in San Giuseppe Jato. His grandfather and great-grandfather, both farmers, were made members of the Mafia. His father Bernardo Brusca (1929–2000), a local Mafia patriarch, served concurrent life sentences for numerous homicides. Bernardo allied himself with the Corleonesi of Salvatore Riina, Bernardo Provenzano and Leoluca Bagarella when he replaced Antonio Salamone as capomandamento of San Giuseppe Jato. He paved the way for his three sons' careers—Giovanni, his younger brother Vincenzo and elder brother Emanuele. When Bernardo was sent to prison in 1985, Giovanni became head of his San Giuseppe Jato district.

Murders
In 1992 Brusca murdered the anti-Mafia prosecutor Giovanni Falcone by planting half a tonne of explosives under a road. Brusca detonated the explosives as Falcone's car drove along the road, killing Falcone, Falcone's wife and his three bodyguards. Months after the Falcone's death, he also murdered the boss Vincenzo Milazzo and the businessman Ignazio Salvo. After Santino Di Matteo was arrested on 4 June 1993, he became the first of Falcone's assassins to become a government witness – a pentito. He revealed all the details of the assassination: who tunnelled beneath the motorway, who packed the 13 drums with TNT and Semtex, who hauled them into place on a skateboard, and who pressed the button.

In retaliation for Di Matteo becoming an informant, the Mafia kidnapped his 11-year-old son, Giuseppe Di Matteo, on 23 November 1993. According to a later confession by one of the kidnappers, Gaspare Spatuzza, they dressed as police officers and told the boy he was being taken to see his father, who was at that time being kept in police protection on the Italian mainland.

Di Matteo made a desperate trip to Sicily to try to negotiate his son's release, but on 11 January 1996, after 779 days, the boy, who by now had also become physically ill due to mistreatment and torture, was finally strangled; his body was subsequently dissolved in a barrel of acid — a practice known colloquially as the lupara bianca. The executioners were Enzo Brusca, brother of Giovanni, Vincenzo Chiodo and Salvatore Monticciolo on the orders of Giovanni Brusca. Shortly before he ordered the murder of Di Matteo, Brusca had also discovered that he had been sentenced in absentia to a life sentence for the 1992 murder of Ignazio Salvo.

Brusca was involved in the campaign of terror in 1993 against the state during their crackdown against the Mafia after the murders of Anti-mafia magistrates Giovanni Falcone and Paolo Borsellino. Following the months after Riina's arrest in January 1993, there were a series of bombings by the Corleonesi against several tourist spots on the Italian mainland – the Via dei Georgofili bombing in Florence, Via Palestro in Milan and the Piazza San Giovanni in Laterano and Via San Teodoro in Rome, which left 10 people dead and 71 injured as well as severe damage to centres of cultural heritage such as the Uffizi Gallery.

Arrest

On 20 May 1996, then aged 39, Brusca was arrested in a small house in the Sicilian countryside near Agrigento, where he was dining with his girlfriend, their young son and his brother Vincenzo, his sister-in-law and their two children. The investigators were able to pinpoint their exact location when the noise of a plainclothes officer driving by the house on a motorbike was picked up by officers listening to a call intercepted on Brusca's mobile phone.

When Brusca was hurried into Palermo's police station some 90 minutes after the arrest, dozens of police officers cheered, honked their horns and embraced each other. As the scruffy-bearded Brusca emerged from a car, clad in dirty jeans and a rumpled white shirt, some ripped off their ski masks, as if to say they no longer had anything to fear from the Mafia. One reportedly managed to slip past guards and punched Brusca in the face.

In 1997, Di Matteo and Brusca met face to face during court proceedings. Bursting into tears Di Matteo told the judge: "I guarantee my collaboration, but to this animal I guarantee nothing. If you leave me alone with him for two minutes I'll cut off his head." The confrontation threatened to become violent, but court security guards restrained Di Matteo. Brusca had also asked Giuseppe Di Matteo's family for forgiveness. In 1999, Brusca was sentenced to 30 years in prison for Di Matteo's murder.

In 1997, Brusca was sentenced to 26 years in prison for the bomb attack that killed the Anti-Mafia magistrate Giovanni Falcone near Capaci. In court, Brusca admitted to detonating the bomb, planted under the motorway from the airport to Palermo, by remote control while watching the magistrate's convoy through binoculars from a hill. Brusca was given another life sentence in 2009, for the murder of Salvatore Caravà.

Collaborating with Italian justice and release
After his arrest, Brusca started to collaborate with police. Initially his collaboration was met with skepticism, fearing his "repentance" could be a ruse to escape the harsh prison terms reserved for ranking Mafia bosses. In the first three months, much of what Brusca said turned out to be either unverifiable or false, and a growing chorus of politicians called for a tightening of the collaboration system.

Brusca had offered a controversial version of the capture of Totò Riina: a secret deal between Carabinieri officers, secret agents and Cosa Nostra bosses tired of Riina's dictatorship. According to Brusca, Bernardo Provenzano "sold" Riina in exchange for the valuable archive of compromising material that Riina held in his apartment in Via Bernini 52 in Palermo. Brusca also claimed that Riina had told him that after the assassination of Falcone, he had been in indirect negotiations with interior minister Nicola Mancino in a deal to prevent any further killings. Mancino later said this was not true, but in July 2012, Mancino was ordered to stand trial for withholding evidence on 1992 talks between the Italian state and the Mafia and the killings of Falcone and Borsellino.

Brusca was imprisoned in Rebibbia, Rome, and though he requested house arrest nine times since 2002, all of these requests had been refused. In 2004, it was reported that Brusca was allowed out of prison for one week every 45 days to see his family, a reward for his good behaviour as well as becoming an informant and co-operating with the authorities. As a result of his collaboration with police, his sentence was reduced to 26 years in prison. On 31 May 2021, Brusca was released, 45 days before the conclusion of his sentence, on parole for four years. Amid public backlash, politicians Matteo Salvini of the Lega Nord and Enrico Letta of the Democratic Party were also critical of the decision to release Brusca.

Confiscated assets
The Brusca family land was seized by the government and in 2000, handed over to an organization called the Consortium for Legal Development. It restores property confiscated from imprisoned mafiosi and gives them back to the community. The small stone farmhouse at San Giuseppe Jato 40 minutes from Palermo was renovated in 2004. It is Sicily's first anti-mafia agriturismo – or farmstay. Tourists can enjoy organic pasta milled from wheat grown on Brusca's land and organic wine made from his vineyards by the Placido Rizzotto cooperative, named after the union leader from Corleone, who was shot by the mafia in 1948.

In popular culture
Giovanni Brusca was portrayed in the 2007 Italian TV series Il Capo dei Capi, the 2018 TV series Il cacciatore, and the 2019 film Il traditore.

He is also portrayed in the Italian series 'The Hunter' which covers the entire period over two seasons following the period after the deaths of Falcone and Borsellino right up to the arrest and imprisonment of Brusca.

References

Bibliography
Jamieson, Alison (2000). The Antimafia: Italy's Fight Against Organized Crime, London: MacMillan Press .

Biographies
 Lodato, Saverio (1999). Ho ucciso Giovanni Falcone: la confessione di Giovanni Brusca, Milan: Mondadori 
 "La deposizione" del collaboratore Giovanni Brusca.

Further reading
Dickie, John (2004). Cosa Nostra: A History of the Sicilian Mafia, London: Coronet .
Follain, John (2008). The Last Godfathers, London: Hodder .

External links
 , Teleacras Agrigento, 28 January 2004

1957 births
Living people
People from San Giuseppe Jato
Gangsters from the Province of Palermo
Sicilian Mafia Commission
Pentiti
Sicilian mafiosi
Sicilian mafiosi sentenced to life imprisonment
Italian people convicted of murdering police officers
Prisoners sentenced to life imprisonment by Italy
People convicted of murder by Italy